Mathew F. May (October 27, 1935 – November 28, 2010) was an American football player, coach, and college athletics administrator.

Playing career
May played college football at St. Benedict's College—now known as Benedictine College—in Atchison, Kansas.

Coaching career
May was an instructor, athletic director, and head football coach at Benedictine College.  He held that position for the 1977 and 1978 seasons.  His coaching record at Benedictine was 10–10.

Head coaching record

College

References

1935 births
2010 deaths
Benedictine Ravens athletic directors
Benedictine Ravens football coaches
Benedictine Ravens football players
St. Mary of the Plains Cavaliers football coaches
High school football coaches in Kansas